Elachista anatoliensis is a moth of the family Elachistidae. It is found in Greece, Turkey and Turkmenistan.

The length of the forewings is 4.4-4.9 mm. The forewings are very narrow and unicolorous white. The hindwings are pale grey and somewhat translucent with an ochreous white fringe.

References

anatoliensis
Moths described in 1990
Moths of Europe
Moths of Asia